South Garden, Virginia may refer to:

South Garden, Albemarle County, Virginia
South Garden, Richmond, Virginia